Měrotín is a municipality and village in Olomouc District in the Olomouc Region of the Czech Republic. It has about 300 inhabitants.

References

Villages in Olomouc District